The 2020 season was Johor Darul Ta'zim Football Club's 47th season in club history and 8th season in the Malaysia Super League after rebranding their name from Johor FC.

Background

Johor Darul Ta'zim FC won their 2019 Malaysia Super League to become the first Malaysian club to win the league titles for six consecutive seasons (2014–2019). JDT returns to win the 2019 Malaysia Cup after defeating Kedah 3-0 at Bukit Jalil National Stadium on 2 November 2019.

JDT failed to qualify for quarter final in Malaysia FA Cup after lost with 0-1 to PKNS at third round on 17 April 2019.

Johor Darul Ta’zim (JDT) FC suffered a shocking 1-0 defeat to PJ City FC in the Malaysia Super League 2019 at the Larkin Stadium on 16 July 2019 ending their hopes of going a fulls season undefeated!

Having won a record sixth Malaysia Super League title couple of weeks back, JDT were just two matches away from repeating their 2016 feat of coasting through a full league season undefeated.

JDT have lost for the first time at the Tan Sri Dato’ Haji Hassan Yunos Stadium in Larkin since April 14, 2012 — a run that lasted for 75 matches (82, if you include their seven wins as Johor FC). JDT had also won 28 consecutive home league matches before lost to Petaling Jaya City FC.

In Asia, JDT in the first time and to become the first Malaysian club to  qualify for AFC Champions League Group Stage. JDT create the first victory after defeating defending champions Kashima Antlers 1-0 at Tan Sri Dato' Haji Hassan Yunos Stadium on 8 May 2019.

Squad

Friendly matches

Tour of UAE

Mid-season Friendlies

Competitions

Overview

Malaysia Super League

Table

Malaysia Super League fixtures and results

Malaysia Cup

AFC Champions League

Table

Group stage

Club Statistics
Correct as of match played on 14 Nov 2020

Appearances

Top scorers

Top assists

Discipline

Transfers and contracts

In

Out

Retained

References 

Johor Darul Ta'zim F.C.
2020 in Malaysian football
JDT
Malaysia Super League seasons